Scopula beccarii  is a moth of the family Geometridae. It was described by Prout in 1915. It is endemic to Eritrea.

References

Endemic fauna of Eritrea
Moths described in 1915
beccarii
Moths of Africa